Leonard Graham (1901–1962) was an English cricketer and association footballer.

Len or Leonard Graham may also refer to:

 Len Graham (singer) (born 1944), Irish folk singer and song collector
 Len Graham (footballer) (1925–2007), Northern Ireland footballer
 Leonard Graham (EastEnders), a character on the BBC soap opera EastEnders

See also
Graham Leonard (1921–2010), British priest